Mo'hogany is the second album by American R&B singer Monifah. It was released on August 25, 1998 through Uptown Records and featured production from Heavy D, Mario Winans and N.O. Joe. Chart-wise, Mo'hogany was more successful than her previous album, making it to 16 on the US Billboard 200 and 2 on the Top R&B/Hip-Hop Albums chart. The album sales increased as its lead single "Touch It" became a top 10 hit, peaking at 9 on the Billboard Hot 100 and becoming the biggest hit of Monifah's career."Monifah's Anthem"/"Bad Girl" (featuring Queen Pen) was a major hit that played on many urban contempary stations across the US such as WAMO in Pittsburgh, WHUR in Washington D.C, & WDAS in Philadelphia with heavy repeat play during the fall of 1998. Mo'hogany was later certified gold by the RIAA.

Critical reception

AllMusic editor Jose F. Promis wrote that Mo'hogany "does incorporate a wide spectrum of sounds and styles, including rock & roll on the awkwardly titled "Monifah's Anthem/Bad Girl" and "Why," plenty of R&B ballads (of which most are lumped together in the middle of the album, weighing it down considerably) [...] Despite some dull moments and less-than-inspired lyrics, Mo'hogany winds up being a decent and relatively enjoyable album."

Track listing

Notes
 signifies co-producer
 signifies additional producer
Sample credits
"Bad Girl" contains replayed elements from "Bad Girls" (1979) as performed by Donna Summer.
"Touch It" contains a sample of "White Horse" (1983) as performed by Laid Back.
"Have You Ever Been Loved" contains elements from "Ann, Wonderful One" (1978) as performed by Stanley Turrentine.
"Why" contains elements from "Freddie's Dead" (1972) as performed by Curtis Mayfield.
"Bad Girl II" contains replayed elements from "Call Me" (1981) as performed by Skyy.

Charts

Certifications

References

1998 albums
Monifah albums
Universal Records albums